David H. Grinspoon (born 1959) is an American astrobiologist. He is Senior Scientist at the Planetary Science Institute and was the former inaugural Baruch S. Blumberg NASA/Library of Congress Chair in Astrobiology for 2012-2013.

His research focuses on comparative planetology, with a focus on climate evolution on Earth-like planets and implications for habitability. He has also studied, written and lectured on the human influence on Earth, as seen in cosmic perspective.

He has published four books, Venus Revealed, which was a finalist for the Los Angeles Times book prize, Lonely Planets: The Natural Philosophy of Alien Life,  which won the 2004 PEN literary award for nonfiction, Earth in Human Hands, which was named one of NPR's Science Friday "Best Science Books of 2016" and Chasing New Horizons: Inside the Epic First Mission to Pluto, co-authored with Alan Stern. He is adjunct professor of Astrophysical and Planetary Science at the University of Colorado.

Early life
Grinspoon was born in 1959. His father was Harvard psychiatrist and author Lester Grinspoon.  He holds degrees in Philosophy of Science and Planetary Science from Brown University and a PhD in Planetary Science from the University of Arizona. He is the nephew of real estate developer and philanthropist Harold Grinspoon.

Career 
Grinspoon serves as an advisor to NASA on space exploration strategy and as an Interdisciplinary Scientist on the European Space Agency's Venus Express spacecraft mission to Venus. In addition to being a science team member of the NASA Astrobiology Institute Titan Team, he serves as science Co-Investigator and team lead for Education and Public Outreach for the Radiation Assessment Detector (RAD) on the Mars Science Laboratory.

His popular writing has appeared in numerous periodicals, such as Slate, Scientific American, Natural History, The Sciences, Seed, Astronomy, The Boston Globe, LA Times, and The New York Times. Grinspoon's technical papers have been published in Nature, Science, and numerous other journals. He has been featured on many television programs including PBS's Life Beyond Earth, BBC's The Planets, and History Channel's The Universe, as well as on NPR's Science Fridays, Wisconsin Public Radio, and BBC World Service shows. He has given invited talks at international conferences throughout the U.S., Europe, and Australia. Grinspoon also writes the bi-monthly "Cosmic Relief" column for Sky & Telescope magazine, where he is also a contributing editor. In addition, he has appeared several times as a guest, and also as guest host, of Neil deGrasse Tyson's popular podcast and live shows StarTalk.

In 2013, he was invited to give the Carl Sagan Lecture at the Fall meeting of the American Geophysical Union.

Grinspoon currently serves as an adjunct professor at Georgetown University.

Awards 
Grinspoon has won many awards including the 2006 Carl Sagan Medal by the Division for Planetary Sciences of the American Astronomical Society for excellence in public communication of planetary science; Alpha Geek 2007 by WIRED Magazine; the 2004 PEN Center USA Literary Award for Research Nonfiction for Lonely Planets; 1997 Los Angeles Times Book Prize Finalist for Venus Revealed; and the 1989 Gerard P. Kuiper Memorial Award at the University of Arizona. In 2018 he was awarded the Eugene Shoemaker Award by the Beyond Center at Arizona State University. In 2022 he was elected as a Lifetime Fellow of the American Association for the Advancement of Science. Asteroid 22410 Grinspoon, a main-belt asteroid, is named after him.

Personal life 
Grinspoon is a musician who has played guitar and composed for many bands. Currently, he is performing with the House Band of the Universe. He lives in Washington, D.C. with his wife.

Notable works
Venus Revealed: A New Look Below the Clouds of Our Mysterious Twin Planet (1998)
Lonely Planets: The Natural Philosophy of Alien Life (2004)
Earth in Human Hands: Shaping Our Planet's Future (2016)
Chasing New Horizons: Inside the Epic First Mission to Pluto (2018)

References

Further reading 
 Long Now talk, 2017, entitled "Earth in Human Hands"
 David Grinspoon giving a TEDx talk entitled "Terra Sapiens: Planetary Changes of the Fourth Kind", in New York City in 2014
 David Grinspoon appearing with Neil deGrasse Tyson and Sarah Silverman on StarTalk Live
 Public Lecture on "Climate Catastrophes in the Solar System: Lessons for Earth", at Case Western Reserve University
 "Terra Sapiens: The Role of Science in Fostering a Wisely Managed Earth", The 2013 Carl Sagan Lecture presented at the American Geophysical Union meeting in San Francisco
 Public talk entitled "Can a Planet Be Alive"  given at the Denver Museum of Nature & Science
 Grinspoon's citation for the Carl Sagan Medal
 Library of Congress interviews David Grinspoon about his relationship with Carl Sagan 
 Inquiring Minds: an Interview with Astrobiologist David H. Grinspoon 
 Shaping the Future of the Earth: From Inside the Library of Congress 
 Article in Astrobiology Magazine, profiling Grinspoon's "Living Worlds Hypothesis"

External links
 

Living people
1959 births
Astrobiologists
Planetary scientists
University of Colorado Boulder faculty
American astronomers
Brown University alumni
University of Arizona alumni